Rescue Dina Foxx! (orig. German title: Wer rettet Dina Foxx?), is atransmedia event by the German television network Zweites Deutsches Fernsehen (ZDF). Development was helmed by director and co-writer Max Zeitler in cooperation with ZDF,  and UFA-lab. The event took place in Germany in April/May 2011 and lasted for six weeks combining TV and internet to highlight the dangers of digital identity theft.  Rescue Dina Foxx! was marketed as an "interactive crime story" and turned into Germany's largest alternate reality game to date.

A TV-crime thriller introduced the story of Dina Foxx who is arrested for murder but claims her world has been manipulated by a digital doppelganger. The film abruptly ended and invited the audience to "Rescue Dina Foxx" by starting a public investigation on the internet and in reality.

Awards and nominations

Awards
Banff Television Festival 2012: Interactive: Best Cross-Platform Projekt: Fiction Programs
Banff Television Festival 2012: Best Interactive Television Programs
New York Festivals 2012: Gold Medal, Television - Online: Online Entertainment Program
Verdi TV-Award 2012: Best TV-Script (Boris Dennulat, Max Zeitler)

Nominations
Rescue Dina Foxx! was nominated for Prix Europa 2011 Online Awards
ZDF's commissioning editors of Rescue Dina Foxx!, Burkhard Althoff and Milena Bonse, were nominated for Grimme Awards 2011 in the category "Special Achievement in TV Fiction"
The title sequence of the TV film Rescue Dina Foxx! was a finalist at the SXSW Film Design Awards "Excellence in Title Design". The title sequence was produced by weareflink GmbH.

References

External links
Rescue Dina Foxx! YouTube - Project Trailer 
Rescue Dina Foxx! - Official summary page on ZDF including a 7-minute trailer 
The TV film - Information about the TV film 
freidaten.org - The privacy NGO in the center of the cross-media event 
Avadata - The privacy company where Dina works 
Privacy Room - Dinas apartment turned into a point&click adventure about privacy issues (German title: Datenschutzraum) 
Qoppamax - The company providing digital security services 
IMDb - Rescue Dina Foxx! on the IMDb

German television specials
2011 in German television
German-language television shows